Performances of Johann Sebastian Bach's Magnificat come in three formats:
 D major version, BWV 243 with the twelve movements of that version;
 D major version, with the Christmas interpolations from the earlier version BWV 243a transposed and inserted after movements 2, 5, 7 and 9.
 E flat major version, BWV 243a. The difference with the previous format is not only the key signature, there are also differences in orchestration, e.g. in the earlier version flutes are not part of the tutti, so do not play in the choral movements 1, 7 and 12, and a trumpet solo in movement 10 instead of the later unison oboes. Other differences are minor, but there is for instance a slightly harsher harmony near the end of movement 4 in the earlier version.

Versions of Bach's Magnificat
The extant autographs of Bach's Magnificat show three versions of his Magnificat:
 E major version without Christmas interpolations, which is how it was probably first performed, at least the autograph of the E major version of the Magnificat (BWV 243a) suggests that Bach intended to perform the first version of his Magnificat also without the laudes, depending on circumstances, for example on other feasts than Christmas.
 E major version with Christmas interpolations, this is how Bach had the piece performed at Christmas 1723. The last measures of the fourth Christmas interpolation are however missing in the autograph.
 D major version (BWV 243), this is the reworked version, without Christmas laudes Bach had performed for the first time at the Marian feast of Visitation 1733.

The first of these versions (BWV 243a without Christmas additions) is not usually performed, while Bach's final version (BWV 243, also without Christmas additions) with its more elaborate orchestration is the most often programmed. The hybrid version (BWV 243, with the Christmas interpolations of BWV 243a transposed and inserted) has found performers and audiences, although BWV 243a, with a reconstructed end of the fourth interpolation, has become more of a standard for performances of the Magnificat including the Christmas interpolations.

Recordings

Differences in recorded performances show some evolution: early performances, often with large choirs, and orchestras of symphonic breadth, tend to have a slower pace, with performance times over thirty minutes (or over 40 minutes when the Christmas interpolations are included) being no exceptions. More recent performance practice leans towards leaner groups of vocalists and smaller orchestras, often using period instruments, and tailored as historically informed performance. Tempos became more vivid and the performance time may be reduced to about twenty minutes for the D major version, and even less than thirty minutes for the full BWV 243a version.

Other differences include whether organ or harpsichord are used as continuo instrument, whether countertenors and/or treble youngsters perform vocal parts, and whether it is recorded with a live audience. Acoustic characteristics of the recording can further be influenced by the performance location, e.g. with our without the high reverberation typical for large church buildings.

For movement D (Virga Jesse), with the end missing in the extant autograph, earlier performances may stop the last Christmas interpolation where the score ends, since, however, in the late 20th century a similarity had been remarked between this piece and another movement in one of Bach's cantatas, a reconstructed ending, based on that composition is more often performed.

Bach composed the work for five soloists: two sopranos, alto, tenor and bass. The soloists are usually listed in the order SI–SII–A–T–B, although some recordings list only one soprano soloist.

Reviews

Herreweghe 2002
 ClassicsToday.com: "bracing but not rushed tempos, infectiously energetic and technically solid contributions from the chorus, and an intelligently paced flow from movement to movement."
 The Guardian: "Herreweghe's accounts are typically thoughtful, not at all theatrical or dramatically driven, and that slightly laid-back approach takes the edge off the Magnificat too, though the quality of the solo and choral singing, and the careful shaping of the orchestral lines are all exemplary."

References

Sources

Scores
 Bach, Johann Sebastian. Magnificat in E-flat major.
 (1720–1739) Autograph: Magnificat E-flat major and Christmas hymns (Berlin, Staatsbibliothek zu Berlin – Preußischer Kulturbesitz, D-B Mus. ms. Bach P 38, at ) Note: Virga Jesse incomplete
 (1811)  First edition of the Magnificat score, E-flat major version, without the Christmas hymns.
 (1862) Von Himmel hoch (SATB) / Freut euch und jubiliert (SSAT, continuo) / Gloria (SSATB with colla parte instruments & violino obligato) / Virga Jesse (fragment – S, B, continuo). Bach-Gesellschaft Ausgabe, Volume 11.1, Appendix. Edited by Wilhelm Rust. Leipzig: Breitkopf & Härtel
 (1959) Magnificat Es-dur: Herausgegeben von Alfred Dürr, Taschenpartituren No. 58. Bärenreiter, 1959.
 (2014) 
 Bach, Johann Sebastian. Magnificat in D major.
 ( 1732–1735) Autograph: Berlin, Staatsbibliothek zu Berlin – Preußischer Kulturbesitz, D-B Mus. ms. Bach P 39:
  Manuscript of BWV 243 at 
Composer's Manuscript at IMSLP
 (1841) Magnificat in D-Dur : Klavierauszug, edited by Robert Franz. Breslau: Leuckart.
 (1862) Bach-Gesellschaft Ausgabe, Band 11.1. Magnificat D dur und vier Sanctus, edited by Wilhelm Rust. Leipzig: Breitkopf & Härtel.
 (1864) Magnificat (in D-dur) bearbeitet von Robert Franz. Leipzig: Leuckart
 (1874) Magnificat in D, in vocal score with an accompaniment for the organ or pianoforte – The adaptation to English words by J. Troutbeck. Novello's Original Octavo Edition. Novello, Ewer and Co.
 (1895) Magnificat in D dur: Klavierauszug von Salomon Jadassohn. Leipzig: Breitkopf und Härtel
 (1924) Magnificat, edited by Arnold Schering. Ernst Eulenburg and Edition Peters.
 ( 1956) Neue Ausgabe sämtlicher Werke, Series 2: Messen, Passionen und oratorische Werke, Volume 3: Magnificat D-dur BWV 243: Klavierauszug (Eduard Müller). Kassel (etc.): Bärenreiter.
 ( 1956) Magnificat D-Dur, BWV 243. Urtext of the New Bach Edition (Alfred Dürr). Foreword by the editor in German. English translation by Hans Ferdinand Redlich. For solo voices (SSATB), chorus (SSATB) and orchestra. Parts for: fl1, fl2, ob1, ob2, bsn1, tpt1, tpt2, tpt3, timp. - organ – strings (3,3,2,2). Duration: 30 min.
 (1959) Magnificat in D major, BWV 243 Urtext edition taken from: J.S. Bach, Neue Ausgabe sämtlicher Werke, Series II, Vol. 3: Magnificat (Alfred Dürr). Preface in German with English translation by Hans Ferdinand Redlich, Jeremy Noble and J. Bradford Robinson. Kassel / New York : Bärenreiter. 11th printing, 2005.
 (2014) 
 Bach, Johann Sebastian. Magnificat in E-flat major and Magnificat in D major (published together)
 (1955) Neue Ausgabe sämtlicher Werke, Series 2: Messen, Passionen und oratorische Werke, Volume 3: Magnificat: erste Fassung in Es-Dur BWV 243a, zweite Fassung in D-Dur BWV 243, edited by Alfred Dürr. Kassel, Bärenreiter.
 (2000) 

Books
 
 
 
 
 
 
 
 
 

 

Online sources
 

 
 
 
 
 
 
 
 
 
 Bach, Johann Sebastian. 
 
 

Discographies of compositions by J. S. Bach